The Canal de la Jeune Autize is a canalised branch of the river Autize in western France. It connects Souil, north of Saint-Pierre-le-Vieux, to the river Sèvre Niortaise in Maillé. It has one lock and is 8.5 km long.

See also
 List of canals in France

References

External links
 Project Babel

Autize
Canals opened in 1850